The Berlin Central and Regional Library or ZLB is the official library of the City and State of Berlin, Germany. It was established as a Foundation by two State laws, initially in 1995 and amended in 2005, combining the following institutions:
America Memorial Library, one of the largest public libraries in Berlin opened in 1954 and initially co-funded with a grant from the United States
Berlin City Library, the municipal library of the city founded in 1901
Berlin Senate Library, the official library of the Berlin Senate, founded on 22 December 1948.
Berlin General Catalog ( or BGK)

In 2011 the library system had more than 3.4 million electronic and printed media.

The Foundation is a legal deposit library for all publications appearing in Berlin. The ZLB also has significant historical and estate collections, and operates the Center for Berlin Studies in Ribbeck-House. The ZLB is a member of the Public Libraries in Berlin (VÖBB) and the Cooperative Library Network of Berlin-Brandenburg (KOBV). Partner libraries are the Centre Georges Pompidou in Paris and the Rudomino All-Russian State Library for Foreign Literature in Moscow.

Locations
Berlin-Kreuzberg  Blücherplatz 1 (America Memorial Library)
Berlin-Mitte Breite Strasse 30–36 (Berlin City Library)
Berlin-Charlottenburg (Berlin Senate Library)

There had been plans to combine the three institutions in a new building at the former Tempelhof Airport, but a 2014 referendum ended the Berlin Senate's plans to open parts of the airport's outfield for development. Debate about a centralised location continued, and in 2018, Blücherplatz was slated as the site for a new central library building. The existing America Memorial Library, which is listed as a historic monument, will have to remain part of the new ensemble. Construction is not expected to start before 2025.

See also
 Berlin State Library
 German National Library
 Kunstbibliothek Berlin
 List of libraries in Germany

References

External links
  
 Website der of the Berlin Senate Library
 VÖBB Online Catalog with the holdings of the ZLB
 E-Loan to the Berlin public libraries

Education in Berlin
Libraries in Berlin
1995 establishments in Germany
Deposit libraries
Libraries established in 1995